The Mourne Mountains  (possibly meaning 'Peaks of the Peak District'), also called the Mournes or Mountains of Mourne, are a granite mountain range in County Down in the south-east of Northern Ireland. The Mournes are designated an Area of Outstanding Natural Beauty and it has been proposed to make the area Northern Ireland's first national park. The area is partly owned by the National Trust and sees many visitors every year. The Mourne Wall crosses fifteen of the summits and was built to enclose the catchment basin of the Silent Valley and Ben Crom reservoirs.

Mountains

The name 'Mourne' is derived from the name of a Gaelic clan or sept called the Múghdhorna. The common Irish name for the mountains, na Beanna Boirche, may mean "the peaks of the peak district" or "peaks of Boirche" (a mythical king and cowherd). It was historically anglicized as 'Bennyborfy'.

Some of the mountains have names beginning "Slieve", such as Slieve Donard, Slieve Lamagan and Slieve Muck, which is derived from the Irish word sliabh, meaning "mountain". There are also a number of curious names: Pigeon Rock; Buzzard's Roost; Brandy Pad; the Cock and Hen; Percy Bysshe; the Devil's Coach Road; and Pollaphuca (from poll meaning "hole" and púca meaning "ghost or spirit").

On clear days, the Mourne Mountains can be seen from the Isle of Man and Dublin.

Other features
The below sub-headings detail other features and visitor attractions found in the Mourne Mountains.

The Mourne Wall

This followed a number of Acts of Parliament allowing the sale, and the establishment of a water supply from the Mournes to the growing industrial city of Belfast. Construction of the Mourne Wall was started in 1904 and was completed in 1922.

The Mourne Wall has been a listed building since 1996, and 600 repairs were completed in 2018 by Geda Construction.

Forests

Tollymore Forest Park is at Bryansford, near the town of Newcastle in the Mourne and Slieve Croob Area of Outstanding Natural Beauty. The Shimna River flows through the park where it is crossed by 16 bridges, the earliest dating to 1726. The river is a spawning ground for salmon and trout and is an Area of Special Scientific Interest for its geology, flora and fauna. The forest has four walking trails signposted by different coloured arrows, the longest being the  "long haul trail". The Forest Park has been managed by the Forest Service since they purchased it from the Roden Estate in 1941.

Donard Forest is near Newcastle, County Down. It borders Donard Park at the foot of the Mourne Mountains. The Glen River flows through the forest, crossed by three stone bridges.

Rostrevor Forest is near the village of Rostrevor, County Down, between the Mourne Mountains and Carlingford Lough, in the Mourne Area of Outstanding Natural Beauty. The first trees, primarily sitka spruce, douglas fir and pine, were planted in 1931.

Reservoirs

All water reservoirs are owned and maintained by Northern Ireland Water (NIW).

Silent Valley Reservoir is a reservoir in the Mourne Mountains near Kilkeel, County Down. It supplies most of the water for County Down, surrounding counties and most of Belfast via the Aquarius pipeline.  The reservoir was built between 1923 and 1933 by a workforce of over one thousand men, nine of whom died during construction.  The catchment area is 9,000-acres (3,600 ha / 36 km2).

Ben Crom Reservoir is upstream of Silent Valley in the Kilkeel River valley, and supplies the same areas. It was constructed between 1953 and 1957.

Spelga Reservoir is in the townland of Spelga (Irish: Speilgeach), close to Hilltown, in the North West of the Mourne Mountains. It was formed by construction of Spelga Dam and sits at over 1,200 ft (370 m) above sea level. The dam was constructed between 1953 and 1957, and has a volume of 2,700,000 cubic metres and a catchment area of 1,340-acres (542 ha / 5.423 km2).

Fofanny Dam Reservoir is approximately 2 km north-east of Spelga Dam and is much smaller.

Flora and fauna
Aside from grasses, the most common plants found in the Mournes are heathers and gorse. Of the former, three species are found: cross-leaved heath, bell heather, and common heather. Of the latter, two species are found: common gorse and western gorse. Other plants which grow in the area are: common cottongrass, roseroot, harebell, marsh St John's-wort, wild thyme, wood sorrel and heath spotted orchid.

Sheep graze high into the mountains, and the range is also home to birds, including the raven, peregrine falcon, wren, buzzard, meadow pipit, grey wagtail, stonechat and snipe. The golden eagle, a former inhabitant, has not been seen in the Mournes since 1836.

Recreation

"Discover Northern Ireland", a website operated by Tourism NI, promotes the Mourne Mountains as a popular destination for hiking and taking in views of the surrounding landscape, including local forests and the coastline. The Mournes offer a range of activities for visitors, including hiking, forest and beach walks, cycling and rock climbing, with nearly three-quarters of visitors choosing the Mournes as a place to go walking and hiking.

The Mournes are a popular destination for Duke of Edinburgh's Award expeditions. However, there are also a number of walking challenges which take place in the Mournes.  The Mourne Wall challenge, which is also referred to as the 7-peak challenge because it takes into account 7 of the 10 highest Mourne mountains, is advertised by WalkNI. The Mourne six peak challenge is advertised by DiscoverNI and takes hikers up Slieve Donard, Commedagh, Bearnagh, Slieve Binnian, Slieve Meelmore and Slieve Meelbeg across three days of hiking.

Information and statistics on tourism to the Mournes were gathered by TourismNI in 2014. In a survey of leisure visitors, 79% were found to come from Northern Ireland, 15% from elsewhere in the British Isles or Republic of Ireland, and 5–6% were international visitors. Two-thirds of all visitors made a single-day trip rather staying overnight, and party sizes averaged between 3 and 4 people.

There are many granite cliffs, in the form of outcrops and tors, scattered throughout the range, making the Mournes one of Northern Ireland's major rock-climbing areas since the first recorded ascents in the 1930s. The rockforms are generally quite rounded, thus often requiring cams for protection, but with good friction. The 1998 guidebook lists 26 separate crags, with a total of about 900 routes of all grades.

Conservation

It has been proposed that the Mourne Mountains be made Northern Ireland's first national park. The plan has been subject to controversy because of the area's status as private property, with over 1,000 farmers based in the proposed park, and also because of fears over the impact on local communities, bureaucracy and house prices.

Gorse burning
Historically, gorse had many uses in the rural economy and hill farmers often cleared gorse by hand. There is also a tradition in the Mournes of controlled gorse burning to improve grazing for sheep. Today, however, many of the fires are unmanaged and some become out-of-control wildfires. In the 1950s, Emyr Estyn Evans had written that some shepherds in the Mournes tended to burn gorse and heather recklessly. He said that such over-burning "results in widespread destruction" and, along with other mismanagement, had "greatly impoverished the mountain environment". In the 21st century there have been hundreds of heather and gorse wildfires in the Mournes each year, the vast majority started deliberately, with "farmers and vandals" often blamed. It is claimed many of the wildfires are caused by hill farmers and landowners carrying out unapproved burning to clear gorse/heather and thus maximize the subsidy payments they receive for the amount of grazing-land they have. Some are also caused by careless visitors. In April 2021, more than a hundred firefighters tackled a major gorse wildfire in the eastern Mournes, which blazed for three days and devastated habitat in the area. The over-clearing of gorse, heather and trees also heightens the risk of landslides.

Wind farm proposal
In 2015, German-owned company ABO Wind applied to build a wind farm at Gruggandoo in the western Mourne Mountains. The turbines would be among the tallest structures in Ireland. The company claims they could power 37% of homes in the district. There is opposition, as the wind farm would be in an Area of Outstanding Natural Beauty and would impact wildlife and habitats. Local protest group, Mourne AONB Against Windfarms, warn it would open the door for further wind farms to be built in the Mournes and other protected areas. Planning officers for Newry, Mourne and Down District Council deem the wind farm "unacceptable" and recommended the council reject it. In 2020, councillors instead voted to ask for a public inquiry.

Popular culture
The mountains are immortalised in a song written by Percy French in 1896, "The Mountains of Mourne". The song has been recorded by many artists, including Don McLean, and was quoted in Irish group Thin Lizzy's 1979 song "Roisin Dubh (Black Rose): A Rock Legend". Frank Baker's famous Ulster-based comic novel Miss Hargreaves refers to it:
"I’m not going to tell you much about the holiday except to say it was a grand month and we enjoyed every bit of it even though it rained much of the time. We went miles in the car, swam in the river, messed about in an old tub of a boat belonging to a farmer; and we spent a good many evenings in the hotel at Dungannon, drinking Irish whiskey and flirting with a cheeky girl Henry rather fell for. We climbed the Mourne Mountains and sang the right song on the top, though we couldn’t remember the words".

"The Mountains of Mourne" are also mentioned in John Lennon's song "The Luck of the Irish" on the album Some Time in New York City.

The scenery of the Mourne Mountains have also provided the backdrop for a number of productions, most famously HBO's Game of Thrones.

Many local painters have depicted the mountains, including the same Percy French, who immortalized them in song.

The Mourne Mountains also influenced C. S. Lewis to create the mythical world featured in his The Chronicles of Narnia series.

Helicopter crash
On 23 October 2010 an AgustaWestland AW109 (tail number: N2NR) was operating a VFR flight from Enniskillen Airport to Caernarfon Airport, Wales. While en route the helicopter crashed into the western side of Shanlieve, killing all three passengers and crew on board. The cause of the accident was determined to be pilot error in heavy fog.

See also
List of mountains in Ireland

Notes

References

External links

About the Mourne Mountains
The website of the book above under 'References'
A local family's site with some information about the mountains
Mournes Climbers
Photos, maps and commentary of the walk around the Mourne Wall
BBC article about the Mourne Wall

Areas of Outstanding Natural Beauty in Northern Ireland
Climbing areas of Ireland
Mountains and hills of County Down
Protected areas of County Down
Geology of Northern Ireland
Mountain ranges of Northern Ireland
Aviation accidents and incidents locations in Northern Ireland